Tequiraca (Tekiráka), also known as Abishira (Avishiri)* and Aiwa (Aewa) and Ixignor, is a language spoken in Peru.  In 1925 there were between 50 and 80 speakers in Puerto Elvira on Lake Vacacocha (connected with the Napo River). It is presumed extinct some time in the mid 20th century, though in 2008 two rememberers were found and 160 words and short sentences were recorded.

The little data available show it to not be closely related to other languages, though a distant connection to Canichana was proposed by Kaufman (1994).

*Other spellings are Auishiri, Agouisiri, Avirxiri, Abiquira, Abigira; it has also been called Ixignor and Vacacocha.

Jolkesky (2016) also notes that there are lexical similarities with Taushiro, likely as a result of prehistoric contact within the circum-Marañón interaction sphere.

Phonology

Consonants 

A single apostrophe ['] indicates glottalization of the corresponding consonant

A double apostrophe [''] indicates aspiration

Vowels 

[:] is the verbalizer

Vocabulary

Michael & Beier (2012)
Aiwa lexical items listed in Michael & Beier (2012):

{| class="wikitable sortable"
! gloss !! Aiwa (aˈʔɨwa)
|-
| ‘(my) husbandʼ || (kun) aˈʃap
|-
| ‘(my) headʼ || (kun) ˈhuti
|-
| ‘(my) brotherʼ || (kun) auˈʃaʔ
|-
| ‘(my) kneeʼ || (kun) kuˈpɨnu
|-
| ‘1st person pronounʼ || kun
|-
| ‘2nd person pronounʼ || kin
|-
| ‘3rd person pronoun, demonstrativeʼ || jan
|-
| ‘agoutiʼ || aʃˈpali
|-
| ‘alone, singleʼ || iˈʃam
|-
| ‘approachʼ || jaˈsik
|-
| ‘autonymʼ || aˈʔɨwa
|-
| ‘ayahuascaʼ || lukˈʔãk
|-
| ‘barbasco (fish poison)ʼ || maˈlahi
|-
| ‘basketʼ || ˈhaʔu
|-
| ‘bathe!ʼ || haɾ kin tsuk
|-
| ‘bigʼ || tuˈkut
|-
| ‘big headʼ || hutuˈluk
|-
| ‘big-bellied personʼ || aˈɾuh tʃuˈluk
|-
| ‘bird sp. (woodpecker)ʼ || isaˈɾawi
|-
| ‘bird sp. (paujil)ʼ || wiˈkoɾõ
|-
| ‘bird sp. (partridge)ʼ || hũʔˈʃũlũ
|-
| ‘bird sp. (pucacunga)ʼ || ɾoˈʔele
|-
| ‘bird sp. (vaca muchacho)ʼ || kʷãˈʔũli
|-
| ‘blue and yellow macawʼ || alkahˈneke
|-
| ‘breastʼ || aˈkiʃ
|-
| ‘caimanʼ || amˈhala
|-
| ‘canoeʼ || aˈtɾewa
|-
| ‘capuchin monkey sp.ʼ || ɾũtɾũˈkʲãwã
|-
| ‘capuchin monkey sp.’ || waˈnaha
|-
| ‘cat sp. (tigrillo)ʼ || hũhũkũˈpãʔ
|-
| ‘cleared pathʼ || tasˈʔãʔĩ
|-
| ‘clothingʼ || kuhˈpaw
|-
| ‘coatiʼ || ʃakˈɾaɾa
|-
| ‘come!ʼ || ˈsikʷas
|-
| ‘cooking fireʼ || asˈkʷãwa
|-
| ‘cornʼ || suˈkala
|-
| ‘cottonʼ || nuiˈnui
|-
| ‘deerʼ || atɾiˈwaʔa
|-
| ‘earthʼ || ahulˈtaʔ
|-
| ‘eat!ʼ || iˈtakʷas
|-
| ‘eyeʼ || jaˈtuk
|-
| ‘firewoodʼ || wiɾuˈkawa
|-
| ‘gardenʼ || tahaˈɾũʔũ
|-
| ‘giveʼ || ɨˈwɨt
|-
| ‘have sexʼ || hiˈtʃinuas
|-
| ‘hereʼ || ˈhiɾwas
|-
| ‘hitʼ || ˈpɨwas
|-
| ‘I am bathingʼ || kun inˈtsukwas
|-
| ‘jaguarʼ || miˈala
|-
| ‘leafʼ || iˈɾapi
|-
| ‘little womanʼ || aslantaˈnia
|-
| ‘little, a little bitʼ || iˈʃikta
|-
| ‘masato, yuca beerʼ || nutˈnɨt
|-
| ‘monk saki monkey sp.ʼ || kʷɨˈɾiɾi
|-
| ‘mosquitoʼ || wiˈʃala
|-
| ‘noʼ || ˈtʃahtaɾ
|-
| ‘non-indigenous personʼ || ˈpaɾi
|-
| ‘penisʼ || jatˈhaka
|-
| ‘pepperʼ || aˈlaha
|-
| ‘potato varietyʼ || jaunaˈhi
|-
| ‘red macawʼ || milahˈneke
|-
| ‘seeʼ || uˈkaik
|-
| ‘snakeʼ || auˈʔek
|-
| ‘squirrel monkeyʼ || siˈaʔa
|-
| ‘stingray sp.ʼ || hamˈham
|-
| ‘stingray sp.ʼ || makɾaˈlasi
|-
| ‘sugar caneʼ || raiwãˈʔãk
|-
| ‘sun, moon, Godʼ || akɾeˈwak
|-
| ‘tamarin monkeyʼ || aslʲaˈʔãũ
|-
| ‘tapirʼ || ˈsahi
|-
| ‘treeʼ || ˈau
|-
| ‘white-lipped peccaryʼ || ɾaˈkãʔõ
|-
| ? || niˈkʲaw
|}

Table comparing Aiwa (Tequiraca) with Waorani, Iquito, and Maijiki (mã́ḯhˈkì; Orejón) from Michael & Beier (2012):

{| class="wikitable sortable"
! gloss !! Aiwa (aˈʔɨwa) !! Waorani !! Iquito !! Maijiki (mã́ḯhˈkì)
|-
| white-lipped peccary || ɾaˈkãʔõ || ˈɨɾæ̃ || anitáaki || bɨ́ɾɨ́
|-
| tapir || ˈsahi || ˈtitæ || pɨsɨ́kɨ || békɨ́
|-
| collared peccary || iˈhaɾa || ˈãmũ || kaáʃi || káókwã̀
|-
| deer || atɾiˈwaʔ || koˈwãnʲɪ || ʃikʲáaha || nʲámà, bósá
|-
| red macaw || milahˈneke || ˈæ̃wæ̃ || anápa || má
|-
| mosquito || wiˈʃala || ˈgʲijɪ || anaáʃi || mɨ́tè
|-
| (my) mother || (kun) ˈama || ˈbaɾã || áni, (ki) niatíha || (jì) hàkò, bɨ́ákò
|-
| (my) father || (kun) ha || ˈmæ̃mpo || ákɨ, (ki) kakɨ́ha || (jì) hàkɨ̀, bɨ́ákɨ̀
|-
| person, compatriot || aˈʔɨwa || waɨɤˈɾãni || árata ɨyáana || mã́ĩ́
|-
| (my) husband || (kun) aˈʃap || nãnɨˈɡæ̃ŋã || ahaáha, (ki) níjaaka || (jì) ɨ̃́hɨ̃́
|-
| head || ˈhuti || ɨˈkabu || ánaka || tʃṍbɨ̀
|-
| ear || ʃuˈɾala || ɨ̃nɨ̃ˈmɨ̃ŋka || túuku || ɡã́hòɾò
|-
| breast || aˈkiʃ || ɤɨˈɨ̃mæ̃ || ʃipɨɨ́ha || óhéjò
|-
| pepper (hot or sweet) || aˈlaha || ˈɡʲĩmũ || napɨ́ki || bíà
|-
| cotton || nuiˈnui || ˈdajɨ̃ || sɨ́wɨ || jɨ́í
|-
| leaf || iˈɾapi || ɨ̃ˈnʲabu, ɨdʲɨ̃ || iímɨ, naámɨ || hàò
|-
| plantain || aˈlaʔa || pæ̃ˈæ̃næ̃ || samúkʷaati || ò
|-
| corn || suˈkala || kaˈɤĩŋɨ̃ || siíkiraha || béà
|-
| cooking fire || asˈkʷãwa || ˈɡɨ̃ŋa || iinámi || tóà
|-
| canoe || aˈtɾewa || ˈwipu || iímina || jóù
|-
| house || atˈku, atˈkua || ˈɨ̃ŋkɨ̃ || íita || wè
|-
| firewood || wiɾuˈkawa || tɪ̃ˈnɪ̃wæ̃ || háraki || héká
|-
| yuca or corn beer || nutˈnɨt || ˈtɪpæ̃ || itíniiha || gónó
|-
| stone || nuˈklahi || ˈdika || sawíha || ɨ́nò, ɡɨ́nò
|-
| sun || akreˈwak || ˈnæ̃ŋkɪ || nunamíja || mã́ĩ̀
|-
| small || iˈʃikta || ˈɡʲiijã || sɨsanuríka || jàɾì
|-
| what? || iˈkiɾi || kʲĩnɨ̃ || saáka || ɨ̃́ɡè
|-
| where? || ˈnahɾi || æjɨ̃ˈmɨ̃nɨ̃ || tɨɨ́ti || káɾó
|-
| no || ˈtʃahtar || ˈwĩĩ || kaa || -mà
|-
| come! || sik, ˈsikʷas || ˈpũɪ || aníma || dáímà
|}

Loukotka (1968)
Loukotka (1968) lists the following basic vocabulary items for Auishiri.

{| class="wikitable sortable"
! gloss !! Auishiri
|-
| one || ismáwa
|-
| two || kismáõ
|-
| head || a-waréke
|-
| eye || o-toroã
|-
| woman || aslané
|-
| fire || yaháong
|-
| sun || akroák
|-
| maize || sukála
|-
| house || atkúa
|-
| white || sukeé
|}

Sources
Harald Hammarström, 2010, 'The status of the least documented language families in the world'. In Language Documentation & Conservation, v 4, p 183 
Alain Fabre, 2005, Diccionario etnolingüístico y guía bibliográfica de los pueblos indígenas sudamericanos: AWSHIRI
Michael, Lev; Beier, Christine. (2012). Phonological sketch and classification of Aewa. (Manuscript).

Earlier lexical sources
Tessmann, Günter. 1930. Die Indianer Nordost-Perus: Grundlegende Forschungen für eine Systematische Kulturkunde. Hamburg: Friederichsen, De Gruyter & Co. (112 lexical items)
Espinoza, Lucas. 1955. Contribuciones lingüísticas y etnográficas sobre algunos pueblos indígenas del Amazonas peruano. Madrid: Consejo Superior de Investigaciones Científicas, Instituto Bernardino de Sahagún. (17 lexical items)
Villarejo, Avencio. 1959. La selva y el hombre. Editorial Ausonia. (93 lexical items)

References

Extinct languages of South America
Languages extinct in the 20th century
Language isolates of South America